Agylla tumidicosta is a moth of the family Erebidae. It was described by George Hampson in 1900. It is found in Guatemala.

References

Moths described in 1900
tumidicosta
Moths of Central America